Anita Muižniece is a Latvian politician. From June 3, 2021 until December 14, 2022 she served as Minister for Education and Science in the Kariņš cabinet. She is affiliated with The Conservatives She was also member of the 13th Saeima.

References 

Living people
Place of birth missing (living people)
Ministers of Education and Science of Latvia
21st-century Latvian politicians
New Conservative Party (Latvia) politicians
21st-century Latvian women politicians
1987 births